Reddi (often stylised in all caps) is a Danish-Swedish all-female pop-rock band. The band represented Denmark in the Eurovision Song Contest 2022 with the song "The Show".

Members 

 Mathilde "Siggy" Savery (from Denmark) – vocals, piano and guitar
 Ida Bergkvist (from Sweden) – bass and guitar
 Ihan Haydar (from Denmark) – drums

Past members 
 Agnes Roslund (from Sweden, 2021–2022) – guitar

Discography

Singles

References

All-female bands
Danish pop rock music groups
Swedish pop rock music groups
Eurovision Song Contest entrants of 2022
Eurovision Song Contest entrants for Denmark